Club may refer to:

Arts, entertainment, and media
 Club (magazine)
 Club, a Yie Ar Kung-Fu character
 Clubs (suit), a suit of playing cards
 Club music
 "Club", by Kelsea Ballerini from the album kelsea

Brands and enterprises
 Club (cigarette), a Scottish brand of cigarettes
 Club (German cigarette), a German brand of cigarettes
 Club Med, a holiday company

Food
 Club (soft drink)
 Club Crackers
 Club sandwich
 Club (biscuit), a brand of biscuits manufactured by Jacob's (Ireland) and McVitie's (UK)

Objects
 Club (weapon), a blunt-force weapon
 Golf club
 Indian club, an exercise device
 Juggling club
 Throwing club, an item of sport equipment used in the club throw
 Throwing club, an alternative name for a throwing stick

Organizations
 Club (organization), a type of association
 Book discussion club, also called a book club or reading circle
 Book sales club, a marketing mechanism
 Cabaret club
 Gentlemen's club (traditional)
 Health club or fitness club, similar to a gym
 Nightclub, a place of entertainment with music and dancing
 Social club
 Sports club
 Strip club also known euphemistically as a "gentlemen's club", an adult entertainment venue with partially clothed or nude dancers
 Student club
 Women's club
 Youth club

Set theory
 Club set, a subset of a limit ordinal in set theory
 Clubsuit, a family of combinatorial principles in set theory

Other uses
 Club good, a type of artificially scarce good amenable to economic analysis
 Club (anatomy), a body part near the tail of some dinosaurs and mammals
 Club (sport), a team, a squad, a sport society that competes in sport competitions
 .club, a generic top level Internet domain

See also
 Club foot (disambiguation)
 Country club (disambiguation)
 The Club (disambiguation)